Club Deportivo UDEA Baloncesto, also known as Damex UDEA Algeciras by sponsorship reasons, is a professional basketball team based in Algeciras, Andalusia, that currently plays in LEB Plata.

History
After being dissolved in 1997, former player Javier Malla re-founded the club in 2017. He acted as coach in the first seasons of the club, in Liga EBA. On 17 May 2019, after only spending two seasons in the league, UDEA Algeciras achieved promotion to LEB Plata.

Season by season

Notable players
 Sam Buxton
 Edmond Koyanouba
 Miguel Ortega Amusco

References 

3. https://www.horasur.com/articulo/deportes/udea-asciende-leb-plata/20190517225051040316.html

External links
Official Page

Basketball teams established in 2017
Basketball teams in Andalusia
LEB Plata teams
Former Liga EBA teams
Sport in Algeciras